The Use of Hereford or Hereford Use was a variant of the Roman Rite used in Herefordshire before the English Reformation.  When Peter of Aigueblanche, Bishop of Hereford, returned to his native Savoy he used it in his church in Aiguebelle.

See also
Use of Sarum
Use of York

References

Roman Rite
Anglicanism
Anglican sacraments
Anglo-Catholicism
Book of Common Prayer